WJEB-TV (channel 59) is a religious television station in Jacksonville, Florida, United States, airing programming from the Trinity Broadcasting Network (TBN). It is owned and operated by TBN's Community Educational Television subsidiary, which manages stations in Florida and Texas on channels allocated for non-commercial educational broadcasting. WJEB-TV's studios are located on Emerson Expressway/US 1 in southeastern Jacksonville, and its transmitter is located on Newton Road in the city's Brackridge neighborhood.

Background
The station first signed on the air on May 29, 1991, and was built and signed on by the Trinity Broadcasting Network, under the licensee Jacksonville Educators Broadcasting, Inc., operated by the TBN subsidiary Community Educational Television. In addition to programming from TBN, the station airs educational programming to prepare local students for the General Educational Development (GED) test to fulfill the requirements under their license service.

Subchannels

References

External links
WJEB page on TBN's website

Trinity Broadcasting Network affiliates
Television channels and stations established in 1991
JEB-TV
1991 establishments in Florida